The Men's recurve team at the 2010 Commonwealth Games took place on 8 October 2010.

Teams
Eleven teams participated in the competition:

Elimination round

References 

Archery at the 2010 Commonwealth Games